Boubacar Traorè (born 26 July 1997) is a Senegalese footballer who currently plays as a forward for Metalist Kharkiv.

Career statistics

Club

References

1997 births
Living people
Senegalese footballers
Senegalese expatriate footballers
Association football forwards
A.C. Tuttocuoio 1957 San Miniato players
Torino F.C. players
Tarxien Rainbows F.C. players
KF Teuta Durrës players
Hapoel Kfar Saba F.C. players
FC St. Gallen players
FC Metalist Kharkiv players
Serie C players
Maltese Premier League players
Kategoria Superiore players
Israeli Premier League players
Swiss Super League players
Expatriate footballers in Italy
Expatriate footballers in Malta
Expatriate footballers in Albania
Expatriate footballers in Israel
Expatriate footballers in Switzerland
Expatriate footballers in Ukraine
Senegalese expatriate sportspeople in Italy
Senegalese expatriate sportspeople in Malta
Senegalese expatriate sportspeople in Albania
Senegalese expatriate sportspeople in Israel
Senegalese expatriate sportspeople in Switzerland
Senegalese expatriate sportspeople in Ukraine